Castel-Sarrazin is a commune in the Landes department in Nouvelle-Aquitaine in southwestern France.

Castel-Sarrazin is the hometown of the top ranking Michelin starred chef Alain Ducasse.

It is mentioned with fondness in the memoirs of Sir John Kincaid. ‘Castle Sarrazin is a respectable little town on the right bank of the Garonne; and its inhabitants received us so kindly, that every officer found in his quarter a family home.’

Population

See also
Communes of the Landes department

References

Communes of Landes (department)